L'Aura is a best-of compilation by Italian singer L'Aura. Released during the Sanremo Music Festival, it contain three new tracks produced by Enrique Gonzalez Müller: Non qui ma qui, Cos'è and Basta!, the song sung in the 2008 Sanremo Music Festival. The album also includes Nell'Aria, a cover of Bocca di Rosa by Fabrizio De André and a live version of Radio Star performed in Rome with the Gnu Quartet.

Track listing
 Basta!
 Irraggiungibile
 Radio Star
 Today
 È per te
 Non qui, ma qui
 Cos'è
 Demian
 One
 Non è una favola
 Una Favola
 Nell'aria
 Bocca di Rosa
 Radio Star (live) (with Gnu Quartet)
 Demons (In Your Dreams) (live) (con Gnu Quartet)  (Deluxe Edition)

Chart

References

2008 greatest hits albums
L'Aura albums